Alain Clark (born 4 June 1979) is a Dutch musician and producer.

Biography 
Alain Clark (born 4 June 1979), is a Dutch singer, songwriter, and record producer. Alain's father is Dane Clark, a Dutch soul singer who had his own successful band Dane and the Dukes of Soul. 

Alain blends pop melodies with his own natural R&B roots to write an organic, electric mix of music layered with infectious harmonies.  

Alain released his debut record album in 2004, a self-titled album which featured the hit "Heerlijk".  Alain wrote the music and produced the album with help from noted producers Fluitsma & Van Tijn. Alain wrote and produced music for Ali B, Simon, Men2B, and for Dutch TV shows including Idols, and Popstars: The Rivals and had his first #1 single with the song "Bigger Than That".  

Alain's career took off with the release of his second album (and first English language album) in 2007, the award winning, Live It Out.  Featuring Steve Gadd on drums, Live It Out has sold nearly 200,000 copies and contains the huge hit "Father and Friend", a duet with his father, Dane Clark.  Alain released Colorblind in 2010, which entered the charts at #1 and went double platinum. Generation Love Revival followed in 2012, and Walk With Me in 2014.

Discography

Albums

Studio albums

Live albums

Singles

References

External links

 Official website

1979 births
Dutch people of Aruban descent
Dutch soul musicians
Living people
Musicians from Amsterdam
People from Haarlem